Conophytum stephanii is a small South African species of Conophytum succulents named after German plant collector Paul Stephan, who tended the succulent collection at the Hamburg Botanic Garden in Hamburg, Germany. The plant was first described by Dr. Schwantes in 1929 and published in "Die Gartenwelt" 33:25.

Description
Bodies are obconical in shape, papillate, and greyish green to deep green in colour. Flowers appear in late autumn, and are nocturnal, strongly scented and off-white to yellow in color.

Distribution
Conophytum stephanii grows in Namaqualand, South Africa, mainly between the towns of Steinkopf and Port Nolloth. Two subspecies are currently recognized: ssp. stephanii and ssp. helmutii.

References

Further reading
Hammer, S.(2002) Dumpling and his wife: New views of the genus Conophytum EAE Creative Colour Ltd. .
Hammer, S.(1993) The genus Conophytum : A Conograph Succulent Plant Publications, Pretoria. .
National Botanical Institute of South Africa.(1993) List of Southern African Succulent Plants Umdaus Press. 
Hammer S. 1998 A note on Conophytum pellucidum Schwantes and C. terricolor Tischer. Mesemb. Stud. Group Bull. 13. (4): 74-75 (1998) - En Geog=5 Systematics: ANGIOSPERMAE (AIZOACEAE: CONOPHYTUM) South Africa (199804669).
Wagner GF. 1996 Conophytum N.E. Br.: Variabilitat der Populationen in der Sektion Pellucida (Schwantes) Tischer ex S.A. Hammer. Teil 2. And. Sukk. 14no.28. (2): 1–4, 12-15 (1996) - col. illus. Ge (En) Icones, Maps. Geog=5 Systematics: ANGIOSPERMAE (AIZOACEAE: CONOPHYTUM) (200101181).

External links

stephanii
Endemic flora of South Africa
Flora of the Cape Provinces
Namaqualand